Mingbuloq is a district of Namangan Region in Uzbekistan. The capital lies at the town Joʻmashoʻy. Its area is 741 km2. Its population is 128,400 (2021 est.).

The district consists of 7 urban-type settlements (Joʻmashoʻy, Goʻrtepa, Dovduq, O‘zgarish, Mehnatobod, Madyarovul, Kugoliqul) and 7 rural communities.

References 

Districts of Uzbekistan
Namangan Region